The Mozambique Defence Armed Forces or FADM are the national armed forces of Mozambique. They include the General Staff of the Armed Forces and three branches of service: Army, Air Force and Navy.

The FADM were formed in mid August 1994, by the integration of the Forças Armadas de Moçambique/FPLM with the military wing of RENAMO, following the end of the civil war.

History
Coelho et al write:
"Independence in June 1975 was preceded by a nine-month transition period in which Frelimo took control of a transitional cabinet where ..it held six of the nine ministries." The previous Forças Populares de Libertação de Moçambique (FPLM), the armed wing of FRELIMO, became the Forças Armadas de Moçambique but retained the FPLM title, becoming 'FAM/FPLM.' From 1975 to the successful conclusions of the Rome negotiations in 1992, former liberation war leader Alberto Joaquim Chipande served as Minister of National Defence.

Under the previous FAM, in 1982, ten provincial semi-autonomous military commands were created; the provincial commanders also acted as second in commands of the provincial government. Coelho et al write:
"the 1st Brigade and the 6th Tank Brigade were located in Maputo; the 2nd Brigade was in Mapai and, together with 8th Brigade based in Chokwe, assured protection of the south; the 3rd Brigade was in Chimoio and the 5th in Beira; the 4th Brigade was placed in Tete, and the 7th in Cuamba, assuring a military presence in Niassa, Cabo Delgado, Zambezia and Nampula, and particularly in the Nacala corridor.."

Throughout the 1980s the FRELIMO government and its armed forces, the Forças Armadas de Moçambique/FPLM, fought the rebel Mozambican National Resistance (RENAMO), which received support by South Africa. The Mozambique Civil War only ended in 1992.

The Mozambique Defence Armed Forces were formed in mid-August 1994 after peace negotiations in Rome had produced the General Peace Agreement (GPA, AGP in Portuguese). The new armed forces were formed by integrating those soldiers of the former government Forças Armadas de Moçambique/FPLM and those among the RENAMO rebels who wished to stay in uniform. They were formed through a commission, the Comissão Conjunta para a Formação das Forças Armadas de Defesa e Segurança de Moçambique (CCFADM), chaired by the United Nations Operation in Mozambique (ONUMOZ).

Two generals were appointed to lead the new forces, one from FRELIMO, Lieutenant General Lagos Lidimo, who was named Chief of the Defence Force and Major General Mateus Ngonhamo from RENAMO as Vice-Chief of the Defence Force. The former Chief of the Army of the Forças Armadas de Moçambique, Lieutenant General Antonio Hama Thai, was retired.

The first three infantry battalions were stationed at Chokwe, Cuamba, and Quelimane.

On 20 March 2008, Reuters reported that President Guebuza had dismissed the Chief and Vice Chief of the Defence Force, Lieutenant General Lagos Lidimo (FRELIMO) and Lieutenant General Mateus Ngonhamo (RENAMO), replacing them with Brigadier General Paulino Macaringue as Chief of Defence Force and Major General Olímpio Cambora as Vice-Chief of Defence Force.

Filipe Nyussi took office as Minister of Defense on 27 March 2008, succeeding Tobias Joaquim Dai. Nyussi's appointment came almost exactly one year after a fire and resulting explosions of munitions at the Malhazine armoury in Maputo killed more than 100 people and destroyed 14,000 homes. A government-appointed investigative commission concluded that negligence played a role in the disaster, and Dai "was blamed by many for failing to act on time to prevent the loss of life". Although no official reason was given for Dai's removal, it may have been a "delayed reaction" to the Malhazine disaster.

In April 2010 it was announced that "the People's Republic of China donated to the FADM material for agriculture worth 4 million euros, including trucks, tractors, agricultural implements, mowers and motorbikes in the framework of bilateral cooperation in the military. Under a protocol of cooperation in the military field, the Government of China will also provide support to the Ministry of Defence of Mozambique with about 1 million euros for the areas of training and logistics. The protocol for granting aid to the Armed Forces for the Defence of Mozambique (FADM) was signed by Defense Minister of Mozambique, Filipe Nyusi, and the charge d'affaires of the Chinese embassy in Maputo, Lee Tongli."

Mozambique has also been involved in many peacekeeping operations in Burundi (232 personnel), Comoros, Democratic Republic of the Congo, East Timor and Sudan. They have also actively participated in joint military operations such Blue Hungwe in Zimbabwe in 1997 and Blue Crane in South Africa in 1999.

Land Forces 

The Mozambican Army was formed in 1976 from three conventional battalions, two of which were trained in Tanzania and a third of which was trained in Zambia. Army officer candidates were initially trained in Maputo by Chinese military instructors. In March 1977, following Mozambique's Treaty of Friendship and Cooperation with the Soviet Union, officer candidates became eligible for training in various Warsaw Pact member states. The Soviet military mission in Mozambique assisted in raising a new army composed of five infantry brigades and an armored brigade. At the height of the civil war, this was gradually increased to eight infantry brigades, an armored brigade, and a counter-insurgency brigade modeled after the Zimbabwean 5th Brigade.

The preexisting FAM was abolished after the end of the civil war under the auspices of the Joint Commission for the Formation of the Mozambican Defence Force (CCFADM), which included advisers from Portugal, France, and the United Kingdom. The CCFADM recommended that former army personnel and an equal number of demobilised RENAMO insurgents be integrated into a single force numbering about 30,000. Due to logistics problems and budgetary constraints, however, the army only numbered about 12,195 in 1995. Force levels rarely fluctuated between 1995 and the mid-2000s due to the army's limited resources and low budget priority.

In 2016, the Mozambican Army consisted of 10,000 troops organised into three special forces battalions, seven light infantry battalions, two engineer battalions, two artillery battalions, and a single logistics battalion.

As of 2017, the serving chief of the army was Major General Eugènio Dias Da Silva.

Equipment
Between 1977 and 1989, the Mozambican Army was lavishly supplied with Soviet weapons, as well as a Soviet-supervised technical programme to oversee their logistics needs and maintenance. Following the collapse of the Soviet Union in 1991, along with the resulting departure of Soviet technical staff, much of this equipment was rendered inoperable. The bulk of the army's hardware remained vested in this ageing and increasingly obsolescent Soviet equipment throughout the 2000s, and serviceability rates have remained low. In 2016, less than 10% of the army's artillery and armoured vehicles were operational.

Small arms

Heavy weapons

Vehicles

Air Force

Navy
There are about 200 personnel in the navy. In September 2004 it was reported that the South African Navy was to donate two of its Namacurra class harbour patrol boat to the Mozambique Navy. The boats were refitted by the naval dockyard at Simon's Town and equipped with outboard motors and navigation equipment donated by the French Navy. The French Navy Durance class command and replenishment oiler Marne (A360) was to deliver the boats to Maputo en route to its ALINDIEN operational area in the Indian Ocean after a refit in Cape Town.

In 2013, the French shipyard CMN Group confirmed a major order by Mozambique, including 6 patrol vessels & interceptors (HSI32). On 29 July 2019 in the first ever visit by an Defence Minister of India Rajnath Singh donated 2 L&T class Fast interceptor boats to the Navy. A team from Indian Coast Guard will also be stationed to train the crew, support for maintenance and operation of the two boats.

Equipment
 PCI-class inshore patrol boat (3 ordered, non-operational)
 MNS Pebane (P-001) ex-Spanish navy Dragonera (P-32) ( 85 tons, 32 meters ) transferred after refit 2012 from the Spanish Navy for a symbolic price (€100).
20 - 25 DV-15 Interceptors. An unknown number of units in active service.
3 x HSI32 Interceptors  
3 x OCEAN EAGLE 43 OPV. Three were acquired as part of the CMN deal. Currently all three are based at Pemba.

References 

 
 
Hoyle, Craig. "World Air Forces Directory". Flight International, Vol. 182 No. 5370. pp. 40–64. .

Further reading
Protocol on the Formation of the FADM, Rome 1992
Cameron R. Hume, Ending Mozambique's War: The Role of Mediation and Good Offices, U.S. Institute of Peace, Washington DC, 1994
Lundin, Irae B, Martinho Chachiua, Anthonio Gaspar, Habiba Guebuzua, and Guilherme Mbilana (2000). Reducing Costs through an Expensive Exercise: The Impact of Demobilization in Mozambique, in Kees Kingma (ed.) Demobilization in Sub-Saharan Africa: The Development and Security Impacts, Basingstoke, UK: MacMillan, 173-212
Anica Lala, Security sector reform in post-conflict environments: An analysis of coherence and sequencing in Mozambique. Examining Peacebuilding Challenges of Defence, Police and Justice Reforms in a Neo-Liberal Era, 2014 Bradford thesis
Anica Lala, Security and Democracy in Southern Africa: Mozambique, 2007
Paulino Macaringue, "Civil-Military Relations in Post-Cold War Mozambique," Ourselves to Know, Institute for Security Studies, 2002.
Martin Rupiya, 'Historical Context: War and Peace in Mozambique,' in Jeremy Armon, Dylan Henrickson and Alex Vines, eds, The Mozambican Peace Process in Perspective, London: Conciliation Resources Accord Series, 1998
Richard Synge, Mozambique: UN Peacekeeping in Action, 1992–94, United States Institute of Peace Press, Washington, D.C., 1997 - includes details on formation of FADM, but has multiple mistakes, including concluding from mid-mission rather than final ONUMOZ report that new army had five (rather than final seven) battalions.
Eric T. Young, The Development of the FADM in Mozambique: Internal and External Dynamics, African Security Review, Vol. 5, No. 1, 1996

Joao Porto, Mozambique contributes to the African Union Mission in Burundi, April 2003

External links

United States Marine Corps, Brotherhood of Arms- story of one Mozambiqican officer's career
 https://wikileaks.org/plusd/cables/1976MAPUTO00888_b.html - details in 1976
 "7000 ghost soldiers found. Soldiers have been paid in cash, and in March actually had to show up to collect. According to Carta de Moçambique (4, 6 May) 7000 ghost soldiers were found. "Among the irregularities detected in recent months is the growing number of children of former combatants, generals, colonels and politicians, who swell the ranks of the FADM and receive salaries without ever having been in military training, let alone setting foot in a military unit," noted Carta. And many salaries of fake soldier were being channelled to senior officials. The scheme also includes the distribution of food, alcoholic beverage, fuel vouchers and rent subsidy. The military will now switch to electronic payments." Joseph Hanlon, Mozambique News Reports and Clippings 596, 16 May 2022, accessible via https://www.open.ac.uk/technology/mozambique/news-reports-clippings-2022. 

Government of Mozambique